, better known as TK, is a Japanese musician and singer-songwriter. He rose to prominence as lead vocalist, guitarist and songwriter of the rock band Ling tosite Sigure, which formed in 2002.

Biography

TK started his solo career with a limited DVD titled Film A Moment. Released in 2011, the DVD features a photobook and a movie shot on 8mm film that acts as a music video for the three tracks on the disc.

TK's first album, Flowering, was released on June 27, 2012 and featured alternate versions of "Film A Moment" and "White Silence" (both being originally featured on the DVD release Film A Moment) along with seven new tracks and an additional hidden track titled "Sound_am326." The limited press version featured a live studio session (DVD) of selected tracks from the album directed by P.B. Anderson. Musicians such as BOBO from Miyavi Crew, and Hidekazu Hinata from Nothing's Carved in Stone featured on the album.

Kitajima's second release was prefaced by the single "Unravel", which acted as the opening for the popular anime series Tokyo Ghoul and the mini-album Contrast. "Unravel" had three versions to note, one of them featuring artwork inspired by the series it fronted, the other featuring a DVD titled Killing You Softly (an acoustic live DVD) featuring the track "Jewel of Sin", which would be featured on TK's third album White Noise. And both TK and Ling tosite Sigure tracks reworked as acoustic pieces. The other version pressed was the standard edition, which featured three tracks, one being featured as the BGM for the Flowering DVD.

The mini-album Contrast was released the same year as "Unravel", being 2014 and featured a live DVD from the 2013 Rock in Japan Festival along with a bonus video filmed in Berlin for the song "Tokio" (limited pressing only). The album also featured a live reworking of the Ling tosite sigure song "Illusion is Mine". Both "Unravel" and "Contrast" contained additional B-sides.

Fantastic Magic is TK's second album and features seven new tracks, one featuring vocalist Chara, a reworking of "Dramatic Slow Motion", and the other being "Contrast". The limited pressing contains music videos for songs featured on the album, along with "Haze", released on Flowering.

Secret Sensation was released in early 2016, Kitajima's second mini-album. As before it featured a live track, this one being "White Silence" and a song that would be reworked on White Noise along with respective B-sides as before. The limited press contained two music videos, one for "Secret Sensation" and the other for "Like There is Tomorrow".

TK's second single, "Signal", was featured as an opening for the anime 91 Days. "Signal" had two versions, one being a digipak release with artwork inspired by 91 Days, the other a standard jewel case. Both versions contained a reworked version of "Shandy", a Ling tosite sigure track from the album Still a Sigure Virgin?; and the acoustic version of "Unravel".

White Noise, being released in November 2016, featured six new tracks: a reworking of "Like There is Tomorrow", the singles "Signal" and "Secret Sensation", and a proper studio recording of "Jewel of Sin". The limited version featured a live DVD from the Secret Sensation Tour. In 2017, TK started to collaborate with Masayuki Nakano from the former electronic music band Boom Boom Satellites.

On November 21, 2018, TK released a new single, containing the song "Katharsis" and its instrumental and TV edit versions, and a song titled "Memento". "Katharsis" was used as the opening theme for the second season of Tokyo Ghoul:re. Its music video was released on November 20, 2018. On December 10, 2018, it was announced that TK will perform the theme song "P.S. Red I" for the Japanese release of the animated film, Spider-Man: Into the Spider-Verse, which was released in Japan on March 8, 2019.

On April 15, 2020, TK released his fourth studio album, 彩脳. April 14, 2021, he released his third EP by the name of Yesworld.

On August 5, 2021, TK releases his first teaser for "egomaniac feedback" compilation album, with release date of Oct 13th, 2021.

Continuing his solo music project, TK, collaborated with Koshi Inaba of B'z at the start of 2022 to release the single As Long as I Love/Scratch on March 26, 2022. 

At the end of 2022, TK will go on to release his hit song First Death with an official music video, do numerous interviews, and release a live of First Death from the Last Death tour filmed on his birthday, December 23.

Discography

Albums

Compilation Albums

Extended plays

Singles

Production

Awards and nominations

References

External links
 Official website
 
 TK discography at Discogs
 TK discography on iTunes
 Official instagram page

1982 births
Japanese male singer-songwriters
Japanese singer-songwriters
Japanese male rock singers
Japanese rock guitarists
Living people
Musicians from Saitama Prefecture
21st-century Japanese singers
21st-century Japanese male singers